There are two books in the New Testament called Epistles of Peter:
First Epistle of Peter
Second Epistle of Peter

See also
Authorship of the Petrine epistles
Letter of Peter to Philip